The Osumi-class tank landing ship were a class of transport ships operated by the Maritime Self-Defense Force. It was recommissioned with the donation of three LST-542 class tank landing ships (LST-1 class final model) from the US Navy. Initially, it was categorized as a amphibious landing ship, but the ship type was changed on 1 April 1971.

Description 
The Maritime Self-Defense Force's transport and landing craft unit consists of six general-purpose landing craft (LCUs) (built in Japan by extraterritorial procurement) and mobile landing craft (built in Japan) provided by the US Navy based on the MSA Agreement in 1955 (Showa 30). LCM) It all started with the establishment of a fleet of 29 ships. However, all of these were small, had limited transport and landing capabilities, and lacked seakeeping. From this, based on the MSA agreement, three LST-542 class tank landing ships, which had been mothballed in the United States, will be provided.

The LST-542 class was the last model of the LST-1 class tank landing ship, and the displacement is increased by adding one layer of bridge and adding machine guns based on the early model, and it is also the latter model In comparison, the amount of cargo loaded has been reduced to 1,900 tons due to the strengthening of water production capacity. In addition, Ōsumi-class had three davits on each side that could carry landing craft such as mobile landing craft (LCM) and vehicle personnel landing craft (LCVP), but JDS Shiretoko has a bridge structure. There is only one on each side.

Ships in the class

Citations

References 
 
 
 

Amphibious warfare vessels of the Japan Maritime Self-Defense Force
Tank landing ships
LST-542-class tank landing ships of the Japan Maritime Self-Defense Force